Alexander Tucker may refer to:

Alexander Tucker (commissioner), colonial era Chief Commissioner of Balochistan
Alexander Tucker (musician), English musician
Alexander Tucker & The Decomposed Orchestra from Haldern Pop